G. M. Jagi was an Afghan field hockey player.

Career 
Jagi competed at the 1948 Summer Olympic Games and played in two of the three matches in their group.

References

External links
 

Field hockey players at the 1948 Summer Olympics
Afghan male field hockey players
Year of birth missing
Possibly living people
Olympic field hockey players of Afghanistan